Colony is the fourth studio album by Swedish heavy metal band In Flames, released on 21 May 1999 via Nuclear Blast Records.

It is the first In Flames album to feature the band's classic line-up; Björn Gelotte switched to lead guitar to replace Glenn Ljungström and Daniel Svensson filled the drummer position left vacant by Gelotte. Peter Iwers became the new bass player, replacing Johan Larsson. With Anders Fridén and Jesper Strömblad remaining on vocals and rhythm guitar respectively, this lineup remained unchanged until 2010.

In 2021, it was named one of the 20 best metal albums of 1999 by Metal Hammer magazine.

Music

Lyrics and musical style
The album deals with various aspects of religion, society, and spirituality, from the somewhat positive light of Embody the Invisible and The New Word, to the more negative Zombie Inc. and Scorn.  Colony features a faster, tighter, and more energetic approach to the music than displayed on the previous album, Whoracle, though the song-writing approach is similar.

Songs
The title of the song The New Word is subject to debate. According to the track list on the back cover of the original 1999 release, the official In Flames web site, and the lyrics printed in the original 1999 CD booklet, the correct title is The New Word; however, according to the heading of the lyrics printed for the song in the original booklet, the track list on the 2004 re-release, and the official Nuclear Blast Records web site, the song is called The New World. The 2009 re-release Colony: Reloaded did nothing to clear up this issue, with the insert and the booklet containing the same inconsistency as the original 1999 release. The song's lyrics themselves, meanwhile, suggest that The New Word is indeed the correct title.

"Pallar Anders Visa" is Swedish and means "Will Anders Visa (credit card) hold up". It is also an instrumental, just like the bonus track, "Man Made God".

The song Embody the Invisible appears in the soundtrack for the video game Tony Hawk's Underground.

The tracks Behind Space '99 and Clad in Shadows '99 (which are only available on different issues of this album) are both remakes of the tracks first heard on Lunar Strain, although Behind Space '99 excludes the acoustic guitar outro present on the original version.

This would be the first time the band would down tune their guitars from C standard on previous album with Ordinary Story and Colony being tuned to drop A#, something they would continue on future albums.

Track listing

Deluxe edition (2004) 
Contains the following, in addition to the above tracks:

 Photo gallery
 Ordinary Story music video (directed by Tamara Jordan)
 Computer wallpapers
 A screensaver
 Winamp skins
 Song lyrics (contains numerous spelling errors)

Colony: Reloaded (2009) 
The enhanced re-release contains the same bonus content as the 2004 deluxe edition. The original 1999 cover is brought back, and the back insert is custom-shaped to fit into the "Super Jewel Box" case that is used.

Credits

In Flames
Anders Fridén – vocals
Björn Gelotte – lead guitar
Jesper Strömblad – rhythm guitar, hammond organ
Peter Iwers – bass
Daniel Svensson – drums

Additional personnel
In Flames - arrangements, engineering, mixing
Jesper Strömblad – all music
Björn Gelotte – co-composition (1–8, 10, 11, 13) 
Anders Fridén – lyrics (1–5, 7, 8, 10, 11)
Prophecies Publishing – publishing
Niklas Sundin – translation
Fredrik Nordström – hammond organ, slide guitar, engineering and mixing
Mikael Stanne - lyrics ("Behind Space '99" & "Clad In Shadows '99")
Glenn Ljungström – co-composition ("Behind Space '99" & "Clad In Shadows '99")
Kee Marcello – second guitar solo ("Coerced Coexistence")
Peter Wildoer – drum technician 
Charlie Storm – programming
Göran Finnberg – mastering
Andreas Marschall – front cover illustration
Flea Back – art direction

References

In Flames albums
1999 albums
Nuclear Blast albums
Albums produced by Fredrik Nordström